David Sánchez Mallo (born 24 December 1998) is a Spanish professional footballer who plays for Hércules CF as a central midfielder.

Club career
Sánchez was born in Madrid, and represented CD Leganés as a youth. He made his senior debut with the C-team in the 2017–18 campaign, in the regional leagues, and also appeared regularly with the reserves in Tercera División during the campaign.

On 11 July 2019, Sánchez moved to another reserve team, Deportivo Fabril also in the fourth tier. He made his first team debut for Dépor on 1 September, coming on as a second-half substitute for Mujaid in a 1–3 away loss against Rayo Vallecano in the Segunda División championship.

On 31 August 2020, Sánchez signed a two-year contract with Hércules CF in Segunda División B.

References

External links

1998 births
Living people
Footballers from Madrid
Spanish footballers
Association football midfielders
Segunda División players
Tercera División players
Divisiones Regionales de Fútbol players
CD Leganés B players
Deportivo Fabril players
Deportivo de La Coruña players
Hércules CF players